Itishpes is a salt lake in the Balkhash-Alakol Basin, part of Balkhash District, Almaty Region, and Moiynkum District, Zhambyl Region, Kazakhstan.

The lake is one of a number of lakes in the region that are known as Alakol. The nearest inhabited places are Burubaytal, Balatopar, Aksuyek and Mirny.

Geography
Itishpes is an endorheic lake of the Balkhash-Alakol Depression. It lies to the south of Shempek Bay, the southernmost area of Lake Balkhash, northwest of the Taukum desert. The border between the Almaty and Zhambyl Regions runs roughly from northwest to southeast across the middle of the lake. The lake has five islands.

In years of exceptional high water, when the level of lake Balkhash may reach  Itishpes lake connects in the northwest with the southern end of lake Balkhash. The shores of the lake are low and the surrounding landscape flat and without tree growth except for reeds.

See also
List of lakes of Kazakhstan

References

External links
Алаколь VS Итишпес - журнала "Ветер странствий"
Озера и реки Казахстана (in Russian)

Lakes of Kazakhstan
Endorheic lakes of Asia
Almaty Region
Jambyl Region
Lake Balkhash